DOU or Dou may refer to:

 Dou (surname) (窦/竇), a Chinese surname
 Empress Dou (disambiguation), Chinese empresses surnamed Dou
 Degree of unsaturation, in chemistry
 Dhammakaya Open University, near Bangkok, Thailand
 Gerrit Dou (1613–1675), Dutch Golden Age painter
 A traditional Chinese unit of measurement, equivalent to a decaliter

See also
 Dou dizhu, a Chinese card game

Surnames of Dutch origin